Basin Bridge Junction is a station on the Chennai Suburban Railway and serves the locality of Basin Bridge, the confluence on the Otteri Nullah and Buckingham Canal, in Chennai, India. The station is located at the southern end of the 'diamond' junction in Chennai, where all the lines of the Chennai Suburban Railway meet. It is the first station after Chennai Central. At this station, the line divides into three: one going towards Avadi and Arakkonam, the other towards Ennore and Gummidipoondi, and the third towards Chennai Beach and Chennai Egmore. Thus, the station acts as the entry point to Chennai Central terminus where inbound trains from all the three lines are stopped before assigning a platform at Chennai Central. It also contains a railway maintenance shed with 19 pit-lines, each measuring 3-ft deep to accommodate about 24 coaches. The station has an elevation of 7 m above sea level.

GMR Vasavi Diesel Power Plant, which has now been dismantled, was situated on the side of Basin bridge opposite to the railway station. Diesel pipes are laid from Chennai Port to Basin Bridge for fuel power of the plant. The Madras Boating Club operates rowing events in this neighbourhood.

History
The lines at the station were electrified in 1979. On 13 April 1979, the Chennai Central–Gummidipoondi section was electrified and on 9 August 1979, the Basin Bridge–Chennai Beach section was electrified. On 29 November 1979, the lines on Chennai Central–Tiruvallur were electrified. The stabling and inspection lines at the station were electrified on 24 December 1979. The additional line between Basin Bridge and Vyasarpadi was electrified on 31 December 1985.

Traffic
As of 2013, the station handles about 10,000 passengers a day.

Connectivity

Road transport
The station is connected by roads to and from the following areas:
Vallalar Nagar (also known as Mint), Washermenpet, Tiruvottiyur
Stanley Government Hospital, Royapuram, Mannadi
Mint Street, Rajiv Gandhi Government General Hospital
Wall Tax Road, Park Town, Sowcarpet, George Town
Vyasarpadi (Vyaasarpaadi), MKB Nagar, KKD Nagar
Pulianthope, Otteri, Ayanavaram
Jamalia (Chennai), Perambur
Choolai, Vepery, Doveton, Purasawalkam
Periamet, Chennai Central railway station
Korukkupet, Tondiarpet
Elephant Gate

Security
The station is covered by the  400-million Integrated Security Surveillance System (ISSS) project implemented in 2012. The project, implemented jointly by the Southern Railways and HCL Infosystems, includes installation of CCTV cameras that would record visuals around the clock and store the data for 30 days, with the footage transmitted and stored using an Internet Protocol system.

See also
 Chennai Suburban Railway
 Railway stations in Chennai

References

Stations of Chennai Suburban Railway
Railway junction stations in Tamil Nadu
Railway stations in Chennai
Year of establishment missing